In the United States, inner suburbs (sometimes known as "first-ring" suburbs) are the older, more densely populated communities of a metropolitan area with histories that significantly predate those of their suburban or exurban counterparts. Most inner suburbs share a common border with the principal city of the metropolitan area and developed along railroad or streetcar lines radiating from the principal city (or at ferry termini, if at water borders).

Atlanta, Georgia

Austin, Texas

Baltimore, Maryland

Baton Rouge, Louisiana 

 Port Allen

Bay Area, California

San Francisco

San Jose

Oakland

Birmingham, Alabama

Boston, Massachusetts

Buffalo, New York

Burlington, Vermont

Chattanooga, Tennessee

Tennessee side

Georgia Side

Chicago, Illinois

Illinois side

Indiana side
 Hammond
 East Chicago
 Whiting
 Gary

Cincinnati, Ohio

Ohio side

Northern Kentucky side

Cleveland/ Akron, Ohio

Cleveland

Akron

Columbus, Ohio

Dayton, Ohio

Denver, Colorado

Detroit, Michigan

Dallas–Fort Worth, Texas

Dallas

Fort Worth

Grand Rapids, Michigan

Hartford, Connecticut

Houston, Texas

Indianapolis, Indiana

Kansas City, Missouri

Missouri side

Kansas side

Little Rock, Arkansas

Los Angeles, California

Louisville, Kentucky

Kentucky side

Indiana side

Madison, Wisconsin

Miami, Florida 

 Miami Gardens, Florida
 Miramar, Florida

Milwaukee, Wisconsin

Minneapolis–Saint Paul, Minnesota

Minneapolis

St. Paul

Nashville, Tennessee

New Orleans, Louisiana

New York City, New York

New York side

New Jersey side

Oklahoma City, Oklahoma

Omaha, Nebraska

Orlando, Florida

Peoria, Illinois

Philadelphia, Pennsylvania

Pennsylvania side

New Jersey side

Pittsburgh, Pennsylvania

Portland, Oregon

Oregon side

Washington side

Providence, Rhode Island

Puget Sound, Washington

Seattle

Tacoma

Rochester, New York

Salt Lake City, Utah

San Antonio, Texas

San Diego, California

Shreveport, Louisiana 
 Bossier City

South Central Pennsylvania

Harrisburg

York

Springfield, Illinois

St. Louis, Missouri

Missouri side

Illinois side

Washington, D.C.

Maryland

Virginia

See also 
 Burgess model
 Suburb

Notes

References 

Urban geography
Suburb